Nick Schroer is an American politician in the Missouri Senate, representing District 2 in St. Charles County. He previously was elected to the Missouri House of Representatives in 2016, 2018, and 2020 to represent House District 107. He won the Republican primary in August 2022, defeating fellow Republican Representative John Wiemann, 57.6% to 42.4%. Then he beat Democratic Party candidate Michael Sinclair with 63 percent in the November general election.

In 2019, Schroer sponsored legislation to ban abortions eight weeks into a pregnancy. The legislation would also prevent women from having abortions if the fetus is diagnosed with Down syndrome.

In 2022, he opposed the Biden administration's COVID-19 vaccine requirements for health care workers.

Election results

Missouri House of Representatives

Missouri Senate

References

External links
 Campaign website
 
 
 

Living people
Republican Party members of the Missouri House of Representatives
21st-century American politicians
Year of birth missing (living people)